The Canadian Institute of Planners (CIP) is a professional organization in Canada for those involved in land use planning. It is responsible for advocating at national and international levels for members, developing public policy positions, and providing services to members. The institute has over 8,000 members from across Canadian, and works closely with the eleven Provincial and Territorial Institutes and Associations (PTIA). It was founded in 1919.

The institute plays an active role in defining the planning profession and working towards more sustainable communities. Presently, the institute defines planning as "the scientific, aesthetic, and orderly disposition of land, resources, facilities and services with a view to securing the physical, economic and social efficiency, health and well-being of urban and rural communities". This definition provides a national focus and unity for the profession, while clearly illustrating the need for planners to work towards sustainability in urban and regional developments.

As the national body for planning, the institute also provides codes of conduct and practice for planners, as well as numerous resources on current trends in planning and allied professions.

Membership

Categories of Membership

Professional Membership 
Planners who have been certified by a Provincial / Territorial body governing planning as a Registered Professional Planner, Licensed Professional Planner, Urbanistes, or equivalent are eligible for this category. Planners who live outside of Canada, or have been licensed by a reciprocal organization are eligible for an international version of this class.

Professional members are the only class entitled to use the professional designation MCIP (Member of the Canadian Institute of Planners). This designation is a registered trademark, only available to professional planners in good standing.

Candidate Membership 
Individuals who are in the process of pursuing full membership, usually possessing an eligible degree from the Professional Standards Board, but completing work experience requirements or exams. International classes for students completing certification with reciprocal bodies or residing outside of Canada are also available.

Student Membership 
Those in post-secondary educational institutions are able to join the CIP as student members, but only students in recognized planning programs are eligible to be voting members.

Public Membership 
Members of the public, planners who are no longer practicing are eligible for non-voting membership.

Membership Benefits 
The primary benefit to full / professional members is the use of the MCIP designation and seal. The designation demonstrates to clients, the public, and employers that a planner meets all professional standards and is part of a profession. Professional and Candidate members are also automatically enrolled in a professional liability insurance program.

A large part of the work CIP does is advocating for the planning profession and the value of planning. The Institute lobbies the federal government and other stakeholders to influence public policy. To educate members and the public CIP regularly hosts events like World Town Planning Day seminars, and its annual national conference. It also regularly hosts online and in person workshops and training seminars on current issues in planning.

To encourage student involvement in planning, the institute offers numerous scholarships and bursaries to those enrolled in planning programs though a separately incorporated planning student trust fund. Nine awards are disbursed annually, totalling over $30,000 in support to students.

Member benefits 
Other member services and benefits include:

a quarterly magazine entitled 'Plan Canada'
free subscription to the 'Zoning Trilogy'
annual awards for planning excellence
annual national conference
online information and services

Reciprocity 
The Canadian Institute of Planners maintains reciprocal agreements with the American Planning Association and the Planning Institute of Australia. These official agreements means planners with certification in one jurisdiction can easily transfer their certification to another, and begin practicing there.

Provincial and Territorial Institutes and Associations 
The Institute represents planning solely at the national level, and works closely with the independent Provincial and Territorial Institutes and Associations (PTIA). Regulation of the profession and certification of members are the purview of PTIAs, as the Canadian Constitution places the regulation of professions within provincial control. While no longer incorporated together, the PTIAs and the Institute function together to regulate, represent, and advocate for planning in Canada

Eleven PTIAs exist in Canada:

 Atlantic Planners Institute
 Newfoundland and Labrador Association of Professional Planners
 Licensed Professional Planners Association of Nova Scotia
 Prince Edward Island Institute of Professional Planners
 New Brunswick Association of Planners
 Ordre des urbanistes du Québec
 Ontario Professional Planners Institute
 Manitoba Professional Planners Institute
 Saskatchewan Professional Planners Institute
 Alberta Professional Planners Institute
 Planning Institute of British Columbia

See also
 American Institute of Certified Planners
 American Planning Association
 Commonwealth Association of Planners
 Global Planners Network
 Planning Institute of Australia
 Royal Town Planning Institute

References

External links
 

Professional planning institutes
Professional associations based in Canada
Urban planning in Canada
1919 establishments in Ontario
Organizations established in 1919